The term EM1 may refer to:

Science and technology
 Old name of Artemis 1, Exploration Mission-1, an ongoing mission for NASA's Orion spacecraft
 Olympus OM-D E-M1, a compact mirrorless interchangeable lens camera 
 Korg Electribe EM-1, a digital synthesizer
 EM-1 Microbial Inoculant, first product in the line of effective microorganism supplements
 EM1, a designation for a vacuum tube, of Magic Eye type

Transport
 British Rail Class 76, or Class EM1, an electric locomotive
 EM-1, a class of Baltimore and Ohio Railroad locomotives
 Elias EM-1, a 1920s prototype US military biplane
 EM1, chassis code for a 1995–2000 Honda Civic coupe
 EM1, a type of Honda E engine used for the Honda Civic during 1980–83

Other
 EM-1, an experimental British assault rifle, precursor of the EM-2 rifle 
 EM1, or Electrician's Mate 1st Class, an enlisted rate in the US Navy and US Coast Guard
 EM1, a category for streaming pupils formerly used in education in Singapore